The Whitehorne House is an example of a United States Federal style mansions at 416 Thames Street in Newport, Rhode Island and is open to the public as a historic house museum.

History
It was built for Samuel Whitehorne Jr. in 1811 and the exterior feature elegant brick constructionm a hipped roof, decorative entry portico, and a formal garden, which are typical of the Federal Style. It is notable as one of the rare houses to be built in Newport in the Federal Style as the period after the Revolutionary War was a period of slow economic recovery for the city. Interior highlights include a grand central hallway, hand carved details, and a significant collection of early American furniture provided by Doris Duke. It includes examples of the artisans Goddard and Townsend, Benjamin Baker and Holmes Weaver. It is currently owned by the Newport Restoration Foundation

The house was listed on the National Register of Historic Places in 1971.

See also

National Register of Historic Places listings in Newport County, Rhode Island

References

External links
Whitehorne House - Newport Restoration Foundation

Houses in Newport, Rhode Island
Houses on the National Register of Historic Places in Rhode Island
Federal architecture in Rhode Island
Historic house museums in Rhode Island
Museums in Newport, Rhode Island
Decorative arts museums in the United States
Historic American Buildings Survey in Rhode Island
National Register of Historic Places in Newport, Rhode Island
Historic district contributing properties in Rhode Island
1811 establishments in Rhode Island